Fly LEVEL SL, trading as LEVEL, is an airline brand under which airlines owned by the International Airlines Group (IAG) operate low-cost flights. The brand has a registered office in Madrid, Spain.

Level was marketed initially as a low-cost, long-haul carrier, and began transatlantic services from Barcelona–El Prat Airport in June 2017. In July 2018, Level expanded with long-haul services from Paris Orly Airport, which took over the operation of IAG subsidiary OpenSkies, and began its first short-haul services from Vienna International Airport, operated by Level Europe.

On 18 June 2020, Level Europe entered insolvency and the brand's short-haul flights operated by the Austrian-based airline were terminated with immediate effect. On 8 July 2020, the shutdown of OpenSkies was announced and initially ended the brand's long-haul flights based at Paris Orly, and although ticket sales for OpenSkies flights under the brand were later restarted, operations did not resume. The brand's long-haul flights from Barcelona operated by Iberia were unaffected by Level Europe's and OpenSkies' closures.

History

Initial launch
Level was established by IAG in response to increased competition in the low-cost long-haul market, including that of Norwegian Long Haul. On 15 March 2017, IAG CEO Willie Walsh announced the new brand, together with four destinations launching in June 2017 from Barcelona–El Prat Airport (later renamed after Josep Tarradellas in 2019). These were Oakland, Los Angeles, Buenos Aires, and Punta Cana. Walsh further noted that the brand was launched a year ahead of schedule. A one-year contract was in place for Iberia to operate Level flights under its airline codes and provide the necessary personnel, which has since been extended as Level had not been issued its own air operator's certificate (AOC).

Walsh stated the corporation due to take over operation of the brand sold 52,000 seats within two days of being established, and over 147,000 after one and a half months, far exceeding IAG's expectations. Rome, Paris, and Milan were also mentioned as possible locations for future expansion of the airline in Europe, together with additional routes out of Barcelona.

Long-haul expansion
In line with the expressed intent to continue with future expansion by adding routes from other European cities, on 28 November 2017, Level announced flights from Paris Orly Airport to Montreal and Point-à-Pitre and flights from Barcelona to Boston to begin from July 2018, and flights from Paris Orly to Fort-de-France and Newark to begin from September 2018. Flights from Paris Orly were to be operated with the AOC and crew of OpenSkies, another airline owned by IAG. 

After the OpenSkies brand was retired on 2 September 2018, its operations were absorbed into the Level brand. On 8 November 2018, flights from Barcelona to Santiago de Chile and New York JFK were announced to begin in March and July 2019 respectively. On 8 May 2019, a service from Paris to Las Vegas was announced to begin from 30 October 2019, which was subsequently terminated by 1 March 2020. On 1 October 2019, a service between Paris Orly and Boston was announced to begin from 31 March 2020, but reservations were later closed between the initial announcement and the planned start of service.

OpenSkies was among three airlines that applied with the French Ministry of Ecology for traffic rights to operate services between France and Brazil, following the relinquishment of airport slots and traffic rights by Aigle Azur and XL Airways France, which had gone defunct during September 2019. Of the five weekly frequencies made available between France and Brazil, OpenSkies applied to operate three weekly services between Paris Orly and Rio de Janeiro under the Level brand, with the intention of eventually using all five frequencies, but was unable to provide a specific operational timeline for when it would increase service. By January 2020, none of the traffic rights were awarded to OpenSkies, with the French Ministry of Ecology instead awarding four frequencies to French Bee, and one frequency to Air France.

The COVID-19 pandemic and its associated impacts on aviation resulted in the grounding of Level's short- and long-haul fleet, and the subsequent suspension of its operations starting in March 2020. On 8 July 2020, IAG announced that OpenSkies, the operator of Level's flights based at Paris Orly, would cease operations, with employee union negotiations and further closing procedures to begin the following week. Despite the announcement of OpenSkies' closure, ticket sales for Paris Orly-based flights operated by the airline were restarted, with operations planned to resume in October 2020, later postponed to December 2020, yet operations never resumed and ticket sales were subsequently closed completely. Level's long-haul flights that were based in Barcelona and operated by Iberia resumed on 11 September 2020, with reduced capacity. As travel restrictions between countries continued to be lifted, Level launched a new route between its Barcelona base and Cancún International Airport on 2 July 2021. In the following months, it announced in September 2021 that its Punta Cana services would resume on 4 December 2021, and in October 2021 that it would resume its services to Los Angeles on 28 March 2022.

Short-haul expansion

On 29 June 2018, IAG announced the launch of a new low-cost Austrian subsidiary, Anisec Luftfahrt, to operate flights from Vienna International Airport, branded as Level, starting from 17 July 2018. The new subsidiary had its own Austrian AOC and based four Airbus A321 aircraft previously used by Air Berlin and Niki in Vienna, from which it planned to serve 14 European destinations on behalf of Level by the end of August 2018. By December 2018, however, Level announced cuts to its Vienna route network, with routes being reduced in frequency or cancelled altogether due to business figures being below expectations.

On 14 March 2019, IAG confirmed plans to open a second base at Amsterdam Airport Schiphol, with seven routes already operated by Vueling transferred from 6 April 2019 to 15 August 2019. Routes once transferred were planned to be operated under the Level brand by Anisec Luftfahrt, with three Airbus A320 aircraft transferred from Vueling to Level in March 2019. On 18 June 2019, during the 2019 Paris Air Show, the International Airlines Group signed a letter of intent to order a total of 200 Boeing 737 MAX 8 and MAX 10 aircraft to be operated across IAG's airlines, possibly including the Level brand, Vueling, and British Airways, although specific allocation amounts between operating airlines were not specified. In December 2019, Anisec Luftfahrt was renamed to Level Europe.

On 18 June 2020, all short-haul flights operated by Level Europe from its bases in Amsterdam and Vienna were terminated as the operating company went into liquidation.

Corporate affairs
Level has a registered office in Madrid, Spain, using space shared with Spanish airline Iberia, which is located on the grounds of Adolfo Suárez Madrid–Barajas Airport. The brand has additional offices on the grounds of Josep Tarradellas Barcelona–El Prat Airport, shared with Spanish low-cost airline Vueling.

Level initially lacked a chief executive officer (CEO) following its launch in 2017, according to former International Airlines Group CEO Willie Walsh. In turn, Vincent Hodder, who had previous experience at British regional airline Flybe, became Level's first CEO on 25 July 2018. Hodder was later succeeded as CEO by Fernando Candela on 9 September 2019, who had previous experience at Spanish airlines Iberia Express and Air Nostrum.

Destinations
, the airlines operating for Level serve, or have previously served, the following destinations.

Long-haul destinations
Starting in March 2017, long-haul flights under the brand were launched from a base at Barcelona–El Prat Airport, with the flights operated by Iberia. Starting in July 2018, long-haul flights under the brand based at Paris Orly Airport were operated by OpenSkies until March 2020 due to the COVID-19 pandemic, after which IAG announced the closure of OpenSkies in July 2020.

Short-haul destinations
Short-haul flights were operated under the brand by Anisec Luftfahrt (later renamed to Level Europe) between July 2018 and March 2020, when operations were initially suspended due to the COVID-19 pandemic. On 18 June 2020, Level Europe went into administration, resulting in all short-haul flights within Europe under the Level brand being terminated with immediate effect. The following table shows the status of each current, former, or planned destination at the time Level Europe's operations were suspended in March 2020, before the airline's official ceasing of operations in June 2020.

Codeshare agreements
, the airlines operating for Level have codeshare agreements with the following airlines:

 Alaska Airlines
 American Airlines 
 British Airways
 Iberia
 Vueling

Fleet

Current fleet

, the combined Level branded fleet consists of the following aircraft:

Former fleet

Level previously had the following aircraft types operate under its brand:

Fleet development
The brand announced plans to expand from three A330-200s in 2017 to at least 15 aircraft by 2022, with the possibility of continuing to acquire Airbus A330s, or possibly moving to Boeing 787s. The brand later stated it was to decide between the Boeing 787 or the Airbus A330-800 for its future widebody fleet plans, as production of the Airbus A330-200 was expected to end in early 2020.

In June 2018, four branded Airbus A321-200 aircraft were added to begin short-haul services before another two Airbus A320-200 aircraft were added starting from March 2019, from the three A320s originally planned to be added. Three additional Airbus A330-200 aircraft operated by OpenSkies were added to the fleet starting in July 2018. In June 2020, the Airbus A320 and A321 aircraft were subsequently retired after Level Europe, the airline responsible for operating short-haul flights under the brand, ceased operations. The following month, OpenSkies ceased operations and its three Airbus A330-200s were transferred to Iberia starting in January 2021, with at least one of the three aircraft repurposed to operate from Level's Barcelona base.

Services

Cabins and service

Premium Economy
Premium Economy on Level's A330 aircraft features 21 reclining seats in a 2–3–2 layout, each featuring  of pitch and including noise cancelling headphones. Seats are equipped with a 12-inch (31 cm) TV screen featuring a complimentary selection of films, TV shows, and music. Passengers are offered a three-course meal, and WiFi is available for purchase. Passengers are also given a baggage allowance of one cabin bag and two checked/hold bags.

Economy
The Economy cabin of Level's A330 aircraft features 293 seats in a 2–4–2 layout, which are equipped with a 9-inch (23 cm) TV screen. In-flight WiFi, in-flight catering, and checked/hold baggage are all available for purchase by passengers.

Frequent-flyer programme
Although the Level brand does not have its own standalone frequent-flyer programme, flights operated by Iberia are eligible to earn Avios points through the airline's Iberia Plus programme. Flights operated by Level Europe or OpenSkies were not eligible to earn Avios points on any programme.

References

External links

Official website

Airlines established in 2017
Austrian brands
French brands
Spanish brands
Low-cost carriers
Spanish companies established in 2017
International Airlines Group
Companies based in Madrid